The Europa Clipper Magnetometer (ECM) is a spacecraft magnetometer aboard the planned Europa Clipper mission. It will be used to precisely measure Europa's magnetic field during consecutive fly-bys, allowing scientists to potentially confirm the existence of Europa's hypothesised subsurface ocean. If this ocean exists, the instrument will be able to determine its depth and salinity, as well as the thickness of the moon's icy shell.

The magnetometer team is led by Margaret Kivelson, with Xianzhe Jia serving as deputy team leader.

Overview

The ECM is a highly sensitive and precise magnetometer used to measure small changes in the characteristics of Europa's magnetic field, studying how they vary according to time and location. The instrument will be stowed in a canister at launch, and will have a total of three flux-gate sensors attached to it. It will deploy to its full length of 8.5 meters (25 feet) in the days after launch.

The spacecraft contains over 300 individual sources of magnetic interference, such as magnets in the propulsion valves, and current loops in the solar arrays. As a result, the instrument will be mounted on an 8.5 meter boom to reduce the effect of this contamination, but will still need to be carefully calibrated in order to account for the effects of these artificial sources.

Originally, a more complex multi-frequency magnetometer (ICEMAG) was planned for inclusion aboard Europa Clipper. This instrument was ultimately scrapped, and later replaced with ECM due to cost overruns.

Objectives
The primary objectives of the ECM instrument are:

 Confirm the existence of a subsurface ocean under Europa's icy surface
 If an ocean does exist, accurately measure its depth and salinity
 Characterize the ice shell by determining its thickness

See also 
 Large strategic science missions

References

Europa (moon)
Europa Clipper
2024 in spaceflight
Orbiters (space probe)
NASA programs
Missions to Jupiter
Proposed NASA space probes
Proposed astrobiology space missions